The Tehran Game Convention exhibition is a video game conference being held by Iran Computer and Video Games Foundation in partnership with Game Connection. The convention is slated to be Iran's first business to business-approached international event in the field of video games.

Iran Computer and Video Games Foundation is a non-government cultural organization which operates under the Ministry of Culture and Islamic Guidance. Its main responsibility is supporting the process of game development and building its industry capacity in Iran. Iran Computer and Video Games Foundation includes members who are active and experienced in the games industry and many other fields, including: cultural policies, market provisions, training, research and game development.

Goals and expectations

The main goal for this event is to create contact between computer game developers in Iran and international publishing companies. 

The game industry in Iran has more than a decade's worth of experience and has created hundreds of fascinating games, yet it has never had an opportunity to enter the international market. It is TGC's intention to create this opportunity for the first time for Iranian game developers.

The community of game developers in Iran is large and active. At TGC, these companies, can finally, by coming to Iran and seeing up close the talents and potentials of Iranian game developers and the Iranian games market, introduce even more growth to the games industry in this country.

Event layout

The TGC exhibition will include three main sessions:

B2B Area
The B2B area of the TGC includes booths and spaces dedicated to business meetings where firms and individuals shall meet to introduce products, services and eventually sign contracts of cooperation and partnership. The B2B area includes the following spaces:
 Regular and VIP meeting places.
 Exhibition area.
 Resting places and dining areas.
 Access to Game Connection meeting application.

Conferences 
The conference area of the TGC is where major speakers from all around the world gather around. The TGC 2018 includes 80 speeches where more than half of the speakers attend from different countries from all over the world. The content of the speeches are categorized into five main sections:
 Technical
 Design
 Art
 Production & Management
 Business

Gamestan Awards (Development Awards)

Gamestan is made up of two parts: game + Persian suffix stan and is used to refer to a great geographical area of the video games industry.

Gamestan is not a politically, or geographically bordered area, but it is a very vast zone enthusiastically intending to cooperate and scale with the rest of the world in the video games industry. 33 countries, from India to Morocco, from Kazakhstan to Yemen, and others like Turkey and Egypt are parts of the area. More than 2 billion people reside in Gamestan, 40 percent of whom play games on a daily basis.

The main objective of the Gamestan Awards is to create opportunities for developers who are looking to find publishers, distributors or investors for their projects. Therefore, previously published games with satisfactory results in the market, who thus are not in need of investors or publishers, shall not enter the competition.

Countries in the Gamestan territory are as below:
 Afghanistan
 Algeria
 Armenia
 Azerbaijan
 Bahrain
 Bangladesh
 Bhutan
 Cyprus
 Egypt
 Georgia
 India
 Iran
 Iraq
 Kazakhstan
 Kirghizstan
 Kuwait
 Lebanon
 Libya
 Maldives
 Morocco
 Nepal
 Pakistan
 Palestine
 Qatar
 Sri Lanka
 Syria
 Tajikistan
 Tunisia
 Turkey
 Turkmenistan
 United Arab Emirates
 Uzbekistan
 Yemen

Game Connection meeting application

This event, which is occurring in collaboration with Game Connection France, will be using a program provided by their management.

Dates and venue

The first edition of TGC was held in July 2017.

TGC 2018 will take place on 5 and 6 July 2018 at the IRIB's International Conference Center.

References

See also 

 Electronic Entertainment Expo
 PAX (event)
 Gamercom
 Game Developers Conference
 Brasil Game Show
 Games Convention
 Asia Game Show
 Paris Games Week
 Tokyo Game Show
 IgroMir

Video game trade shows
Trade fairs in Iran